Labour Youth is the youth wing of the Labour Party of Ireland. Membership is open to those aged from 16 to 30 years old.

History

1979–2000 
Labour Youth succeeded the Young Labour League as a full section of the Party in 1979, under Party Leader Frank Cluskey. Members were active in the election of presidential candidate Mary Robinson, forming a base of membership during the campaign that would provide the backbone of leadership within the organisation for years to come. They provided leadership to the National Youth Council of Ireland and in 1992 were among the founding members of the European Council of Socialist Youth. In 1999, along with the main party, Labour Youth merged with Democratic Left Youth.

2000–present 
The Spring 2007 issue of Labour Youth's internal publication, The Left Tribune, shows support for abortion and same sex marriage, along with contributions from Michael D. Higgins.  In the 2007 General Election Labour Youth opposed a pre-election pact with the centre-right party Fine Gael. Also in 2007, it supported the Venezuelan revolution. In 2009, Labour Youth criticised the then government's attitude to education. The Autumn 2007 issue of The Left Tribune promotes Labour Youth's support of Cuba and its endorsement of the International Brigade in Spain, with then Labour Youth Recruitment Officer Enda Duffy featuring in a photograph of a panel at a commemoration event and the noted naming of the UCD Labour Youth branch in honour of Michael O'Riordan. Also in 2009, it collaborated with CYM (linked with the Communist Party) on environmental campaigns. The group undertook an active and visible role in the 2011 Irish General Election in support of young candidates such as Ciara Conway, Patrick Nulty and Derek Nolan. They later called on the Party to abandon talks on forming a coalition government with Fine Gael, describing the proposal as undemocratic.

Since the turn of the 2000s, Labour Youth has run campaigns on repealing the 8th Amendment, against sexism, voting rights for 16 and 17 year olds, workers rights, same sex marriage, sexual consent, ending Direct Provision, along with other issues related to students and young people. Labour Youth also takes an active role in supporting young Labour candidates in elections. In 2009, the organisation donated €14,000 to 'young candidates'. 

In 2015, Labour Youth released a policy paper on ending Zero Hour contracts and stated that Ireland was leading the way in LGBTQ+ rights. In February 2015, Chairperson Jack Eustace stated that more companies 'should follow Eircom's lead' in job creation. In 2016, it released a document opposing homophobia, transphobia and sexism. In May 2016, at a gathering of the Social Democratic and Labour Party (SDLP) youth group and the Labour Party youth group in Belfast, joint chairs Grace Williams (LY) and Conal Browne (SDLP) emphasised the importance of young people supporting the EU. In June 2016, Labour Youth released a statement saying that they were 'deeply shocked' by the UK-EU Referendum result, with Chairperson Grace Williams stating that "It is my firm belief that international cooperation is vital in tackling common global issues such as corporate tax evasion, climate change, and responding to the refugee crisis. As global citizens, we are all equally responsible for solving these issues. No country can tackle these issues alone. Unfortunately, the UK vote has left a series of unanswered questions. Among a plethora of other concerns such as workers' rights, job creation, and trade, I am extremely worried for the future of the North of this island. We must not allow the result of this referendum to threaten the peace process and the many years it took to bring about stability. We must not forget that the campaign that drove this referendum result was one of fear and hate. It is crucial that we, as a society, come together to eradicate the xenophobia and racism that Leave advocates deem acceptable. We will not accept hate in our society. Continued cooperation is essential. I will be reaching out to our colleagues in the SDLP and British Labour Party over the coming days".

In 2017, Labour Youth released a document proposing state funded tuition for higher level education. In November 2016, former USI President Kevin Donoghue had been elected Chairperson of Labour Youth at the organisation's annual conference. In 2017, Labour Youth condemned the income-contingent loan scheme and launched a campaign for workers to be paid the Living Wage. In December 2017, actions by Labour Youth in Maynooth had been condemned as “juvenile” and “disrespectful” after ‘F*** the Pope’ was posted twice from their official social media account. An image of the Communications Officer of Labour Youth, Liam Haughey, was posted with him holding a sign which read “I am pro-choice because… F*** the Pope”. The Labour Party released a statement acknowledging the posts, saying they were brought to the party’s General Secretary but had since been removed.

In March 2018, Labour Youth welcomed the Board of Trinity College’s decision to make concessions on two of the Take Back Trinity Movement’s demands – to scrap the unfair €450 charge for supplemental exams and granting fee certainty fees for postgraduate and international students. Labour Youth also called on Ryanair to 'address the concerns of pilots'. In late 2018, in the midst of Ireland's housing crisis, Labour Youth distanced itself from claims by the Labour Party leadership that direct actions such as occupations of buildings were not a valid form of political protest. This was followed by then Labour Youth Chairperson Chloe Manahan stating "Civil disobedience and protest have been core to this movement since its inception. It is crucial that Labour activists feel supported and empowered to do what is moral, just and right – not simply what is allowed”.

Labour Youth played an active role in the 2019 Irish local elections supporting several of their members who ran for local councils. Former Chair Kevin Donoghue was elected to Dublin City Council while former Secretary Ciara Galvin was elected to Kildare County Council. As of its website update in 2019, Labour Youth said that it "recognises the importance" of the proposed Che Guevara statue in Galway City. Labour Youth members canvassed for UK Labour in the 2019 United Kingdom general election. In 2019, Labour Youth reiterated its support of the EU. In September 2019, a Labour Youth campaign on 'decent housing for all' was launched by Chairperson Patrick Ahern.

Following his election at the Labour Youth National Conference in Waterford City, which was held on the weekend before 25 November 2019, Cormac Ó Braonáin was Labour Youth's Chairperson until his death on 15 December 2019, having fallen off his bicycle after trying to cycle on a Luas track on the way home from a birthday party. In the weeks following his death Adrian McCarthy announced his candidacy for chair and was subsequently elected in March 2020.

The year 2020 saw the re-expansion of Labour Youth branches at council level, such as the Labour Youth Lucan-Palmerstown Branch and the Muskerry Labour Youth Macroom LEA - Timothy Quill Branch. According to official Facebook pages, the last presence of a Labour Youth branch at council level appears to be a Clondalkin-Rathcoole Branch, however this branch page has not posted anything since 4 March 2017. June 2020 also saw long term Labour Youth activist and former National Youth Executive officer Declan Meenagh co-opted to Dublin City Council to replace Senator Marie Sherlock. Legally blind, Meenagh has long been known for his local activism in the Cabra-Glasnevin area along with his work on disability rights. 

Labour Youth released a post-coronavirus society document in July 2020. In it included the retention of rent freezes, permanent state-ownership of hospitals, a 'revamp' of industrial relations, opposition to 'green' capitalism, the implementation of Slaintecare and a 'vast' housing programme, universal childcare, commitment to co-operatives, public ownership, cultural vibrancy, LQBTQ+ friendly spaces, the ending of worker exploitation, an overhaul of education and climate justice.

Structure 
As a prominently student organisation, Labour Youth has long had a presence in many universities and (formerly) institutes of technology across Ireland. Originally confined to the larger universities such as Trinity, UCD and UCC, in more recent years efforts have been made to expand.
	
Labour Youth is currently represented in:
Trinity College, Dublin
University College Dublin
Dublin City University
Dublin Institute of Technology
University College Cork
Maynooth University
Institute of Technology, Carlow
National University of Ireland, Galway
Cork Institute of Technology

According to Facebook, there was a Labour Youth branch set up in Queen's University Belfast, however, its Facebook page has not posted any content since January 2014.

Constituency/Combined Constituency level:
Dublin South West
Dublin South Central
Dublin Central
Dublin Bay North
Dun Laoghaire-Rathdown
Dublin West
Dublin Mid-West
Kildare North
Kildare South
Northern Ireland
Tipperary 
Wexford
Wicklow
Cork East
Carlow-Kilkenny
Cork South Central
Cork North Central

Council level:
 Muskerry Labour Youth Macroom LEA - Timothy Quill Branch
 Labour Youth Lucan-Palmerstown Branch

Executive
The National Youth Executive (NYE) is responsible for the day-to-day running of Labour Youth. Officers are elected to the NYE at Youth Conference, held in November each year. The Labour Party Youth & Development Officer, currently Sumyrah Khan, is an ex-officio, non-voting member of the NYE.

Current Executive

Former National Chairs

Tom Johnson Summer School
The Tom Johnson Summer School is held annually in July. It is named after Tom Johnson, the first leader of the Labour Party and the only leader to date to serve as the leader of the opposition in Dáil Éireann. At Tom Johnson, panel discussions are held on a number of topics, with speakers from within and outside of the Party.

Publications
Labour Youth publishes The Left Tribune on a regular basis.

References

External links
 
 The Left Tribune

Labour Party (Ireland)
Youth wings of political parties in Ireland
Youth wings of social democratic parties